Streptomyces lycii is a bacterium species from the genus of Streptomyces which has been isolated from the plant Lycium ruthenicum from Alar in Xinjiang.

See also 
 List of Streptomyces species

References 

lycii
Bacteria described in 2020